Philippe Richard (born February 25, 1962) is a French artist, based in Paris, France. He lived New York from 1996 to 1999. He has been very close to some American painters such as Joan Mitchell and Shirley Jaffe. Some of his work resides in the THEODORE:Art gallery  in Brooklyn, New York.

Biography 
Richard  studied painting at the School of the Art Institute of Paris (École nationale supérieure des Beaux-Arts).
From 1994 to 1996 he did a residency at Straumur Art Commune in Iceland.
From 1994 to 1995 he received a grant « Leonard de Vinci » to go to Iceland.
In 1997 he received a grant from the FIACRE (Fonds National d’Art Contemporain) to do a project in New York.
In 1998 he also did a residency at the International Studio Program, in New York.

Statement
Since a few years ago, Richard’s paintings leave the canvas to benefit the art space and its walls. This work started in 1996 in Iceland when he released 180 bottles into the sea, each containing a different gouache titled « Months, years ». The bottles were combined with a series of 77 paintings on driftwood from the Icelandic beaches. Since then, a third of the gouaches have been found and collected by different people from Norway, Germany and the United Kingdom.
Thanks to this experience he started to rethink his idea about painting and surfaces. Since 1997 he started a long series of "painting steles" and "atmospherics variables", "earth edges" and "lineaments" where parallel works run during the reassessment of paintings.
Philippe Richard considers his paintings as juggling between physical spaces and canvas’ spaces. The exhibition space is no more a receptacle; Philippe Richard starts to build a relationship between art pieces and art spaces so that it becomes an active background. Matrix is the result of all his research, making the paintings and the art spaces one.

Selected solo exhibitions

2013
"International Accident", Theodore:Art, Brooklyn NY 
"Autre pareil, Musée des Beaux-arts de Dunkerque, France 
2012
 "Comment dire", La MACC,  Fresnes (Val-de-Marne), France
 "Indubitablement",  galerie Bernard Jordan, Paris, France
 "Kristin Arndt Philippe Richard", galerie Gudrun Fuckner, Ludwigburg, Germany
2011
 "Idées fixes", Galerie Bernard Jordan, Zurich, Germany 
 "Two, Lisa Beck, Philippe Richard", Stephanie Theodore Art, New York, United States

2009
 "Rien à voir avec Henri Matisse", Matisse Museum (Le Cateau), France
 "Souvent d’ailleurs parfois", Galerie Bernard Jordan, Paris, France 
2008
 "No limit 4 (enfin seul)", La vigie, Nimes, France
2007
 "Yvetot, donc, vaut Constantinople", Galerie Duchamp, Yvetot, France
 "Fragile", galerie Bernard Jordan, Paris, France
2006
 "Laumeier (38° 32′ 56.45″ N / 90° 24′ 54.56″)", Laumeier Sculpture Park, St. Louis, United States
 (with Egide Viloux), galerie de l’école des beaux-arts, Besançon, France

Selected group exhibitions
2012
 "La fureur de l’éternuement", ESADHaR, Rouen, France
2011
 "Il paesaggio in transito",  Societa Siciliana per la Storia Patria, Institut Culturel Français de Sicile, Palermo, Italy
 "Autre pareil, carte blanche à Philippe Richard", Musée des Beaux-arts, Dunkirk, France
2010
 "L’arabesque",  Bleu acier inc., Tampa, Florida, United States
2009
 "Off the wall", Lennon Weinberg Gallery, New York, United States 
 "Sculpteurs de trottoir", Le Quartier, Centre d’Art Contemporain, Quimper, France
 "Global painting", Les Tanneries, Amilly, Loiret, France
 "Matisse Hoje", Pinacoteca do Estado de São Paulo, Brésil
2008
 "Grandes surfaces", Ecole Supérieure des Beaux-Arts, Le Mans, France
 "de réalité, 60 artistes internationaux", Le Hangar à Bananes, Nantes, France
 "Provisoire II", Musée des beaux-Arts, Tourcoing, France
 "Out of the grey", galerie Jordan-Seydoux, Berlin, Germany
2006
 "Abstraction(s), carte blanche à Bernard Jordan", Matisse Museum (Le Cateau), France
2005
 "Interventions", Savanah College of Art and Design, Lacoste, Vaucluse, France
 "Jim Schmidt Contemporary Art", St. Louis, United States

Bibliography 
 Philippe Richard, Painting outside the Lines, Laumeier Sculpture Park, texte de Kim Humphries, en, 2006, Saint-Louis, 6 pages, 
 Philippe richard, Le bord du monde n'existe pas, La peinture, à la limite, Red District, texte de Karim Gaddhab, fr/en, septembre 1999, Marseille, 24 pages, 
 Philippe Richard, Miscellaneous: Installations and paintings, europäisches kultur- und informationszentrum in thüringen, Erfurt, 1997, 36 pages

Articles 
 STL Today: "Laumeier exhibition", Visual Art, text from David Bonetti, October 12, 2006
 Art Press: Edition spéciale jeune scène française (Fiac 2001), text from Eric Suchère, October 2001, Supplément
 TMM: "Thri Jiuvidarlist i Paris", text from Gunnar Halldorsson, is, June 2001
 Contemporary Visual Art: "Peinture, trois regards", Mick Finch, March 2001, Issue 33
 Art Press: "Peintures, trois regards", text from Tristan Trémeau, February 2001
 Art Press: "Le bord du monde n'existe pas", text from Eric Suchère, June 2000
 Art Press: "Couleur, couleurs", text from Eric Suchère, March 1998, nº223
 Art in America: "Philippe Richard", text from Eric Suchère, January 1998
 Beaux-Arts Magazine: "Exception française à la Villa Medici", text from Tristan Trémeau, 1997
 Tribeca: "Philippe Richard", text from Françoise-Aline Blin, April/May 1997
 Die neue bildende Kunst: "Die polymorphe malerei", text from Eric Suchère, October/November 1996
 Art Press: "Philippe Richard", text from Eric Suchère, December 1995
 Kunstforum: " Der Herzog auf dem Kirschen und die Prinzessin aug der Erbste", text from Maribel Königer, November 1995
 Beaux-Arts magazine: " Philippe Richard, le fond, la forme et l'illusion", text from Karen Rudolph, October 1995

References

Living people
20th-century French painters
20th-century French male artists
French male painters
21st-century French painters
21st-century French male artists
Artists from Dijon
1962 births